Speleodentorcula is a monotypic genus of gastropods belonging to the family Argnidae. The only species is Speleodentorcula beroni.

The species is found in Europe.

References

Argnidae